Akhsakadamakhi (Dargwa: Ахсакъадамахьи) is a rural locality (a selo) in Burgimakmakhinsky Selsoviet, Akushinsky  District, Republic of Dagestan, Russia. The population was 205 as of 2010. There are 2 streets.

Geography 
Akhsakadamakhi is located 10 km southeast of Akusha (the district's administrative centre) by road. Geba is the nearest rural locality.

References 

Rural localities in Akushinsky District